Hybrid Web Cluster is a software product developed by Hybrid Logic Ltd., a Bristol, United Kingdom based company. The software is designed to provide commodity web hosting in a distributed and fault-tolerant manner  on a cluster of either real physical servers or virtual cloud computing infrastructure server instances.

Features
 Runs standard LAMP stack web applications.
 Works on real hardware and virtualized cloud computing infrastructure.
 Has a configurable level of replication redundancy.
 Enables instant and automatic scalability.

Technology
This software splits each website and database into individual units of work - the load generated by each is monitored closely and the cluster automatically and transparently transfers websites and databases between cluster nodes such that no single node is ever overloaded. A single website can go from having no load at all to requiring its own dedicated web and database servers within seconds. Only one server is ever live for a particular website or database at any one time, enabling existing applications to run un-modified just as they would on commodity shared web hosting.

Scalability
The upper bound on the scalability of this system is that no single website can ever utilise more than two servers at once - under this condition all standard LAMP applications will run unmodified. However, it is possible to scale beyond this limit via the use of multi-master database replication - this requires that applications store all variable state information within a database - the database can then be live on many servers, the web application itself must remain static and can be served from as many nodes in the cluster as required.

Redundancy
It is possible to specify a redundancy invariant - this sets the number of machines in the cluster that should hold a copy of each website or database. By default this number is set to 2, this means that under normal operation all data will be held on at least two cluster nodes at any one time. If a cluster node fails, the system acts to automatically recover its data and resume web hosting within 15 seconds. This is achieved using the filesystem snapshotting capabilities of ZFS.

Release
Hybrid Web Cluster began beta testing in September 2010.

HybridCluster 2.0 was released on 1 May 2013.

See also 
 Cloud computing
 Cloud platform
 Cloud infrastructure
 ElasticHosts
 Amazon Elastic Compute Cloud
 Rackspace Cloud
 GoGrid
 FlexiScale

References

External links 
 Official site
 Development blog

Cloud computing providers
Cloud platforms